Home Sweet Home is a Windows game developed by Big Blue Bubble that was also released for WiiWare on October 24, 2008 in Europe, and on November 3, 2008 in North America. It has been described as a "home decorating sim".

Overview

Home Sweet Home sees players in the role of a home decorator and their team tasked with renovating the homes of a number of clients. Working with a budget and the client's own tastes, players first lay down a blueprint of their design before sending in their team to realize it. Over 400 pieces of furniture will be available in total, with more furniture and game features unlockable as players progress through the game. The game is viewed from a fixed isometric view similar to The Sims or the online game Habbo.

Control in the Wii version is mainly centered on the pointer function of the Wii Remote. However, the player can speed up the building process by using the motion controls to perform tasks such as hammering nails or painting walls.

Reception
Nintendo Life gave Home Sweet Home a score of 6 out of 10. Despite noting "fairly basic" graphics and sound, and the fact that it is not aimed at hardcore gamers, they believed that the game's 50 levels and the ability for the player to design their own dream home would appeal to those who enjoy the design aspects of games such as The Sims.

References

External links
Big Blue Bubble Home Sweet Home WiiWare page

2007 video games
Construction and management simulation games
Video games developed in Canada
Windows games
WiiWare games
Wii games
Big Blue Bubble games
Single-player video games